The following lists events that happened in 1918 in Iceland.

Incumbents
Monarch – Kristján X
Prime Minister – Jón Magnússon

Events
19 October – Icelandic sovereignty referendum, 1918
1 December – Danish–Icelandic Act of Union
1918 Úrvalsdeild

Births
26 September – Ólafur Jóhann Sigurðsson, novelist, short story writer and poet (d. 1988)
18 November – Óli B. Jónsson, football player and manager (d. 2005)

Deaths

14 November – Torfhildur Þorsteinsdóttir, writer (b. 1845).

References

 
1910s in Iceland
Iceland
Iceland
Years of the 20th century in Iceland